Lyulyakovo is a village in Ruen Municipality, in Burgas Province, in southeastern Bulgaria, which has a train stop on the Sindel (village)-Karnobat railway, served only by passenger trains.

References

Villages in Burgas Province